Carl Edward Nichols (born October 14, 1962) is an American former Major League Baseball (MLB) catcher. He played parts of six seasons in the major leagues, from 1986 until 1991, for the Baltimore Orioles and Houston Astros, appearing in a total of 96 games while batting .204 with 18 RBIs.

Nichols was drafted by the Baltimore Orioles in the fourth round of the 1980 MLB draft. He played in the minor leagues from 1980 through 1991, both before and after his MLB appearances. Nichols later played in the independent Northern League (1993–1995) and Western Baseball League (1996–1997).

Within MLB, Nichols appeared in a total of 36 games for the Orioles, during the 1986 through 1998 seasons, and a total of 60 games for the Houston Astros, during the 1989 through 1991 seasons. He appeared in 69 games as a catcher, four games as an outfielder, and three games as a first baseman.

Following his playing career, Nichols has been active in coaching, including six years with the MLB Urban Youth Academy. 

Nichols is the uncle of former MLB player Ray Lankford.

References

Further reading

External links
, or Retrosheet

Major League Baseball catchers
Baltimore Orioles players
Houston Astros players
Bluefield Orioles players
Hagerstown Suns players
Miami Orioles players
Macon Peaches players
Newark Orioles players
San Jose Bees players
Redwood Pioneers players
Charlotte O's players
Rochester Red Wings players
Tucson Toros players
Sioux City Explorers players
Reno Chukars players
Mission Viejo Vigilantes players
Baseball players from Los Angeles
1962 births
Living people
Sioux Falls Canaries players
Compton High School alumni